Pascal Bollini (born February 15, 1966 in Jarny, France) is a former professional footballer.

External links
Pascal Bollini profile at chamoisfc79.fr

1966 births
Living people
French footballers
Association football defenders
CS Sedan Ardennes players
Stade de Reims players
Chamois Niortais F.C. players
Ligue 2 players